Chris Paul Harman (born 19 November 1970) is a Canadian composer of contemporary classical music.

He grew up in Toronto, attending Maurice Cody Public School, then North Toronto Collegiate Institute. He is currently a Professor of music composition at McGill University.

Awards
 Finalist, CBC Radio National Competition for Young Composers (1986 - the youngest finalist ever)
 Winner for "Iridescence", CBC Radio National Competition for Young Composers (1990 - youngest composer ever awarded the Grand Prize)
 First prize in the under-30 category for Iridescence, International Rostrum of Composers in Paris, France (1991 - first Canadian)

See also
List of Canadian composers

External links

1970 births
Living people
Canadian classical composers
20th-century classical composers
21st-century classical composers
International Rostrum of Composers prize-winners
Jules Léger Prize for New Chamber Music winners
Canadian male classical composers
Musicians from Toronto
20th-century Canadian composers
20th-century Canadian male musicians
21st-century Canadian male musicians